Michail Grobman (born 1939) is an artist and a poet working in Israel and Russia. He is father to Hollywood producer Lati Grobman and Israeli architect Yasha Jacob Grobman.

Biography
 1939 – Born in Moscow.
 1960s – Active member of The Second Russian Avant-Garde movement in the Soviet Union.
 1967 – Member of Moscow Artists Union.
 1971 – Emigrates to Israel and settles in Jerusalem.
 1975 – Founded the Leviathan group and art periodical (in Russian).
 Since 1983, he lives and works mainly in Tel Aviv.

Awards
 In 2001, Grobman was a co-recipient of the Dizengoff Prize for Painting.

Solo exhibitions

 2007 – Last Skies, Loushy & Peter Art & Projects, Tel Aviv (cat. text: Marc Scheps)
 2006 – Creation From Chaos to Cosmos, Bar-David Museum of Fine Art and Judaica, Kibbutz Baram (cat. text: Sorin Heller)
 2002 – The Last Sky, installation, Tsveta Zuzoritch pavilion, Belgrad (cat. text: Irina Subotitch)
 1999 – Michail Grobman: Works 1960–1998, The State Russian Museum, St. Petersburg (cat. texts: Evgenija Petrova, Marc Scheps, Lola Kantor-Kazovsky, Michail German)
 1998 – Picture = Symbol + Concept, Herzliya Museum of Art, Herzliya (cat. texts: Lola Kantor-Kazovsky, Marina Genkina)
 1995 – Password and Image, University Gallery, Haifa University (Leaflet)
 1990 – Michail Grobman, Tova Osman Gallery, Tel Aviv
 1989 – Michail Grobman, Tova Osman Gallery, Tel Aviv
 1989 – The Beautiful Sixties in Moscow (Jointly with Ilia Kabakov), The Genia Schreiber University Art Gallery, Tel Aviv University, Tel Aviv (cat. text: Mordechai Omer)
 1988 – Michail Grobman: Künstler und Sammler, Art Museum, Bochum, Germany (cat. text: Peter Spielmann)
 1987 – Messiah, installation and performance in the streets of Jerusalem (cat.)
 1985 – Khlebnikov 100, performance in the streets of Acre, Jerusalem, Tiberias and Tel-Aviv
 1984 – Michail Grobman, Zvi Noam Gallery, Beit Levik, Tel Aviv
 1977 – Michail Grobman, Spertus Museum, Chicago
 1977 – Performance in Judean desert
 1973 – Michail Grobman, Negev Museum, Beer Sheva
 1973 – Michail Grobman, Beth Uri and Rami Museum, Ashdot Yaacov (cat.)
 1972 – Michail Grobman, Nora Gallery, Jerusalem
 1971 – Michail Grobman: Paintings, Drawings, Prints, Tel Aviv Museum of Art, Tel Aviv (cat. text: Haim Gamzu)
 1966 – Michail Grobman, Projects Engineering Institute, Moscow
 1965 – Michail Grobman, Artists House, Moscow
 1965 – Michail Grobman, Energy Institute, Moscow
 1965 – Michail Grobman, History Institute, Moscow
 1965 – Michail Grobman, Usti-nad-Orlicy Theatre, Czechoslovakia (leaflet text: Dushan Konetchni)
 1959 – Michail Grobman, Mukhina Art Institute, Leningrad

Writing

 "Moscow Diaries", New Literary Observer, vol. 84, 2007 – in Russian
 Last Sky – Poems, New Literary Observer, Moscow, 2006 – in Russian
 "Poems and Articles", Symbol We: Jewish Anthology of Russian Literature, New Literary Observer, Moscow, 2003 – in Russian
 Leviathan: Diary 1963–1971, New Literary Observer, Moscow, 2002– in Russian
 "Leviathan. Manifestos", Zerkalo, vol. 19–20, 2002 – in Russian
 Military Notebooks – Poems, Leviathan Publishers, Tel Aviv, 2002 – in Russian
 "about Vladimir Jakovlev", Vladimir Jakovlev: Zivopis, Grafika, catalogue of the exhibition, State Tretyakov Gallery, Moscow, 1995
 "The Enigma of Isaak Levitan", Isaak Levitan, 1860–1900: Sketches & Paintings, Exhibition Catalogue, Tel Aviv Museum of Art, Tel Aviv, 1991
 "About Malevich", Avant-Garde – Revolution – Avant-Garde: Russian Art from the Collection of Michail Grobman, Exhibition Catalogue, Tel Aviv Museum of Art, Tel Aviv, 1988
 "About Malevich", The Avant-Garde in Russia 1910–1930: New Perspectives, Exhibition Catalogue, Los Angeles County Museum of Art, MIT Press, Cambridge, Massachusetts, 1980
 Leviathan, newspaper of modern art and literature, nos. 1–3 (1975–1980) – in Russian

Selected bibliography
 Valentin Vorobiov, Vrag Naroda. , New Literary Observer, Moscow, 2005
 Irina Alpatova (ed.), Galart, Moscow, 2005
 Matthew Baigel, "Soviet Artists, Jewish Imagery: Selections from The Norton and Nancy Dodge"
 "Collection of Soviet Non-Conformist Art", Zimmerly Journal, vol. 2, 2004
 "A-Ya: Unofficial Russian Art Review", Art Chronic, Moscow, 2004
 Victor Pivovarov, Vlubleniy Agent, New Literary Observer, Moscow, 2001
 Lidya Sooster, My Sooster, Avinarius, Tallinn, 2000
 Gunter Hirt, Sascha Wonders (Eds.), Präprintium, Moskauer Bücher aus dem Samizdat Edition Temmen, Bremen, 1998
 Alexander Goldstein, Rasstavanie s Nartsisom, New Literary Observer, Moscow, 1997
 
 "Interviews Michailom Grobmanom", Simurg, Jerusalem, 1997
 Marina Genkina, "Vtoroi Russkiy Avant-Garde", in Evrei v Kulture Russkogo Zarubezia, vol. 5, Jerusalem, 1996
 Anna Zhuravleva, Vsevolod Nekrasov, Paket, Moscow, 1996
 Michail Gorelik, "Russkij ili Russkojazytchnyy", Novoye Vremia, vol. 43, 1996
 Victoria Motchalova, "Energia Voproshania", Inostrannaia Literatura, vol. 2, February 1996
 Marc Scheps (ed.), The Art of the Twentieth Century: Lexicon, Taschen, Cologne, 1996
 Andrey Voznesensky, "Kabalisticheskaia Expertiza", Obozrevatel, vol. 12, December 1995
 Karl Eimermacher, Vladimir Jakovlev: Gemälde, Aquarelle, Zeichnungen Bayer, Bissingen, 1995
 E. Beaucamp, "Die Kunst sucht ihre Zeit", Frankfurter Allgemeine Zeitung, 22 July 1995
 Volfgang Kazak, "Konets Emigratsii", Znamia, November 1994
 Rossijskaia Evreiskaia Entsiklopedia, Rossijskaia Academia Nauk, Moscow, 1994
 Thomas Strauss, "Anschlag auf den Heiligenschein der Bilder", Magenta, Munchen, 1994
 V. Pavlov, "Popugay s Toporom", Iskusstvo, January 1994
 
 F. Raphael, "From the left Bank to the West Bank", Mirabella vol. 1, October 1990
 Thomas Strauss, "Bilder einer Gottessuche", Frankfurter Allgemeine Zeitung, 18 July 1988
 Michail Tchernyshov, Moskva 1961–67, New York, 1988
 F. Rotzer, "Kunstlergruppen zeigen Gruppenkunst-werke", Kunstforum, vol. 91, 1987
 Israel Shamir, Sosna i Oliva, Wahlstorm Publishers, Jerusalem, 1987
 Velemir Chlebnikov, Stichi, Poemi, Proza, Gileia, New York, 1986
 Alexander Glezer, Russian Artists in the West: Third Wave, Jersey City, 1986
 Marina Genkina, "Michail Grobman", The Shorter Encyclopaedia Judaica in Russian, vol. 3, The Hebrew University, Jerusalem, 1986
 Stephen Feinstein, Soviet Jewish Artists in the USSR and Israel, Armonk, New York & M. E. Sharpe, London, 1985
 
 Rimma and Valery Gerlovin, "Russian Samyzhdat Books" Flue, vol. 2, New York, Spring 1982
 Viktor Tupitsin, "Russian Art", Kolkhoz, vol. 2, New York, 1982
 A. Rovner (ed.), Gnosis Anthology, 2 vols, Gnosis Press, New York, 1982
 L. Bechtereva (Galina Manevich), Varianty Otrazenij, A-Ya, Paris, 1982
 A.Volochonsky, "Leviathan v Belom Svete", Dvadtsat Dva, 15, Tel Aviv, November 1980
 
 Frantishek Kincl (ed.), Schwarz auf Weiss, vol. 6, Düsseldorf, August 1980
 
 
 Miriam Tal: "Magischer Symbolismus in Israel: Werk und Personlichkeit von Michail Grobman" Das Neue Israel, vol. 3, Zurich, September 1974
 Yuri Kuperman, "No Places: The Jewish Outsiders in the Soviet Union", Soviet Jewish Affairs, vol. 2, London, Summer 1973
 Miriam Tal, "Two Russian Artists", Israel Magazine, vol. 11, November 1972
 Miriam Tal, "Les Arts en Israel", Liberté, vol. 82–83, Montreal, October 1972
 Miriam Tal, "Painters from Soviet Russia", Ariel, vol. 30, Spring 1972
 Reuven Berman, "Art out of Russia", The Jerusalem Post, 24 December 1971
 J. Nicholson, "La Nouvelle gauche a Moscou: notes sur quelques autres", Chroniques de I'art vivant, September 1971
 Arsen Pohridni, "I Clandestini del penello", Panorama 240, Milano, 19 November 1970
 A. M. Fabian, "Russische Avantgarde heute", Madame und Elegante Welt, Munchen, 1970
 Arsen Pohribny, "Art and Artists of the Underground", Problems of Communism, Washington, March–April 1970
 Asiaticus (Arsen Pohribny), "I pittori del disegno", L'Espresso Colore, Roma, 16 March 1970
 W. Schulze-Roempell, "Russische Avantgarde", Die Welt, 27 February 1970
 G. Engels, "Moskaus Avantgarde herausgeschmug-gelt", Kolnische Rundschau, 5 February 1970
 V. Vanslov (ed.), Sovetskoe Izobrazitelnoe Iskusstvo i Zadachi Borby S Burzhuaznoj Ideologiei, Izobrazitelnoe Iskusstvo, Moscow, 1969
 Dušan Konečny, Hledání Tvaru, Svei Sovetu, Prague, 1968
 Jindřich Chalupecký, "Ouverture a Moscou", Opus International, no. 4, London, 4 December 1967
 Miroslav Lamač, "Quelques jeunes peintres", Opus International, no. 4, London, 4 December 1967
 Jindřich Chalupecký, "O Moderno Urneni v Sovetskern Svazu", Vytvarne Prace, Prague, 21 September 1967
 Jiři Padrata, "Neue Kunst in Moskau", Das Kunstwerk, vol. 7–8, Baden-Baden, April-May 1967
 Miroslav Lamač, "I giovani pittori di Mosca", La Biennale die Venezia, vol. 62, Venezia, 1967
 Jiři Padrata, "Neue Kunst in Moskau", Kulturni Tvotba, Prague, 5 January 1967

References

External links
Michail Grobman Personal info website.
Michail Grobman time-line at loushy.com
Michail Grobman pictures Minotaure Gallery
Michail Grobman on museum.ru website
Michail Grobman on magazines.russ.ru website

1939 births
Living people
Artists from Moscow
Russian Jews
Soviet emigrants to Israel
Israeli people of Russian-Jewish descent
Israeli painters
Russian male painters
Modern painters
Russian avant-garde